Zinck is a surname. Notable people with the surname include:

Hardenack Otto Conrad Zinck  (1746–1832), German-Danish composer
Kenneth Zinck (born 1959), Fijian politician
Marie Zinck (1789–1823), Danish actress and opera singer
Pia Zinck (born 1971), Danish high jumper
Trevor Zinck (born 1970), Canadian politician